Tedalinab (GRC-10693) is a drug developed by Glenmark Pharmaceuticals for the treatment of osteoarthritis and neuropathic pain, which acts as a potent and selective cannabinoid CB2 receptor agonist. It has a very high selectivity of 4700x for CB2 over the related CB1 receptor, has good oral bioavailability and has shown promising safety results and effective analgesic and antiinflammatory actions in early clinical trials. Many related compounds are known, most of which also show high CB2 selectivity.

See also
 CBS-0550
 Olorinab
 SER-601

References 

Cannabinoids
Tert-butyl compounds
Fluoroarenes
Nitrogen heterocycles